A Clean Sweep is a 1958 British comedy film directed by Maclean Rogers and starring Thora Hird, Eric Barker and Vera Day.

Plot
A woman tries to keep her family of gamblers away from temptation.

Cast
 Thora Hird as  Vera Watson
 Eric Barker as  George Watson
 Vera Day as  Daphne Watson
 Ian Whittaker as  Dick Watson
 Wallas Eaton as  Ted
 Bill Fraser as  Bookmaker

References

External links
 

1958 films
1958 comedy films
British comedy films
Films directed by Maclean Rogers
1950s English-language films
1950s British films